Blue Room is the debut album by American punk rock band Unwritten Law, released in 1994 by Red Eye Records. It was the band's first full-length album and established their presence in the prolific San Diego music scene of the early 1990s. The album attracted the attention of Epic Records, who re-released it a year after its original release.

The album's title is a reference to the single-room apartment that singer Scott Russo lived in during the band's early years and where most of the album was written (the room was painted entirely blue). The song title "C.P.K." stands for "Crazy Poway Kids" and is a reference to the band's hometown of Poway, California (a suburb of San Diego). "Blurred (Part 2)" is a reference to a song on the band's debut EP Blurr. The songs "Shallow" and "Suzanne" would be re-recorded for their second album Oz Factor.

Track listing

Personnel

Band
Scott Russo - vocals
Steve Morris - lead guitar
Rob Brewer - rhythm guitar
John Bell - bass guitar
Wade Youman - drums

Production
Dave Nestor – producer, engineer
Mike Monroe – executive producer
John Golden – mastering

Artwork
Greg Raymond – graphic design
Bagel – cover art - Nathan Bagel Stapley
Mike Krull – disc art
Wade Youman – other artwork
Ben Davis – photography

References

External links
Blue Room @ discogs.com

Unwritten Law albums
1994 debut albums